Tan Sri Acryl Sani bin Haji Abdullah Sani (Jawi: اقر الثاني عبدﷲ ثاني; born 3 October 1961) is a Malaysian police officer who has served as the 13th Inspector-General of Police (IGP) since May 2021. He served as the Deputy Inspector-General of Police (DIG) from August 2020 to his promotion to IGP in May 2021.

Education 
Acryl Sani graduated from Universiti Teknologi Malaysia with a Bachelor of Engineering degree in civil engineering. He also obtained a Master of Science degree in management from the Universiti Utara Malaysia.

Career 
Acryl Sani joined the police force on 2 February 1986 as a Cadet Assistant Superintendent. Since then, he has held various positions in the police force, including Director of Internal Security and Public Order Department, Director of Commercial Criminal Investigation Department, Department of Strategic Resources and Technology Department and Sarawak Police Commissioner.

Deputy Inspector-General of Police 
Acryl Sani rose to the rank of DIG on 14 August 2020 and has taken the office of DIG from the retiring Mazlan Mansor.

Inspector-General of Police 
Minister of Home Affairs Hamzah Zainudin announced on 30 April 2021 that Acryl Sani will replace the retiring Abdul Hamid Bador as the 13th and new IGP with effect on 4 May 2021 after the contract of Abdul Hamid ends on 3 May 2021 and presented him the appointment document. On 3 May 2021, the handing-over ceremony of IGP was held and the powers of IGP were officially transitioned to Acryl Sani and marked the end of IGP term of Abdul Hamid, he also pledged to announce the new directions of PDRM in future and to do his best in this most important appointment. On 6 May 2021, Acryl Sani held a press conference at Bukit Aman to announce the identifications of the candidates of his deputy, the new Deputy Inspector-General of Police and claimed that he would discuss list of candidates and appointments of several Bukit Aman department directors to replace the incumbent directors who are scheduled to retire between May and September 2021 with Hamzah and Secretary-General of the Ministry of Home Affairs (KDN) before shortlisted names are referred to the Police Force Commission (SPP). The announcement of the appointments of new Deputy IGP and several Bukit Aman department director will be made after Hari Raya.

Honours
Acryl Sani was bestowed with the following honours:
  :
  Officer of the Order of the Defender of the Realm (KMN) (1999)
  Commander of the Order of Meritorious Service (PJN) – Datuk (2019)
  Commander of the Order of the Defender of the Realm (PMN) – Tan Sri (2021)
 Royal Malaysia Police :
 Loyal Commander of The Most Gallant Police Order (PSPP) (2011)
 Courageous Commander of The Most Gallant Police Order (PGPP) (2016)
  :
  Knight Companion of the Order of the Crown of Pahang (DIMP) – Dato' (2006)
  Grand Knight of the Order of Sultan Ahmad Shah of Pahang (SSAP) – Dato' Sri (2016)
  :
  Knight Commander of the Order of Taming Sari (DPTS) – Dato’ Pahlawan (2015)
  Knight Grand Commander of the Order of Taming Sari (SPTS) – Dato’ Seri Panglima (2020)
  :
  Knight Commander of the Order of the Defender of State (DPPN) – Dato’ Seri (2020)
  :
 Grand Commander of the Exalted Order of Malacca (DGSM) – Datuk Seri (2021)

References

1961 births
Living people
Malaysian police chiefs
Malaysian police officers
People from Selangor
Malaysian people of Malay descent
Malaysian Muslims
University of Technology Malaysia alumni
Commanders of the Order of Meritorious Service
Officers of the Order of the Defender of the Realm
Commanders of the Order of the Defender of the Realm